This is a list of parliamentary by-elections in the United Kingdom held between 1885 and 1900, with the names of the previous incumbent and the victor in the by-election and their respective parties.  Where seats changed political party at the election, the result is highlighted: light blue for a Conservative (including Liberal Unionist and Irish Unionist) gain, orange for a Liberal (including Liberal-Labour and Liberal/Crofter) gain, light green for an Irish Parliamentary Party (including the Irish National Federation Anti-Parnellite Nationalist group from March 1891, but not the Irish National League Parnellite Nationalist faction when the IPP was split between December 1890 and 1900) gain and grey for any other gain.

Resignations

Where the cause of by-election is given as "resignation" or "seeks re-election", this indicates that the incumbent was appointed on his own request to an "office of profit under the Crown", either the Steward of the Chiltern Hundreds or the Steward of the Manor of Northstead.  These appointments are made as a constitutional device for leaving the House of Commons, whose Members are not permitted to resign.

By-elections

References

F. W. S. Craig, British Parliamentary Election Statistics 1832-1987
F. W. S. Craig, British Parliamentary Election Results 1885-1918
F. W. S. Craig, Chronology of British Parliamentary By-elections 1833-1987

1885
19th century in the United Kingdom